Maximilien Dominic (Maxime) Cormier (December 21, 1878 – January 14, 1933) was a Canadian politician. He was elected to the House of Commons of Canada in the 1930 election, representing the riding of Restigouche—Madawaska as a member of the Conservative Party.

He died in office in 1933.

External links
 

1878 births
1933 deaths
Conservative Party of Canada (1867–1942) MPs
Members of the House of Commons of Canada from New Brunswick